Slap in the Face is a 1970 West German comedy film directed by Rolf Thiele and starring Curd Jürgens, Gila von Weitershausen, and Alexandra Stewart.

It is a loose remake of the 1937 film Seven Slaps. A young woman slaps the board of a bank she believes has swindled her out of her money. In a change from the earlier film, and as part of director Thiele's growing move towards sex comedies, she is naked when she does so.

The film was shot on location in Hamburg, Lübeck and the Selenter See.

Cast

References

Bibliography

External links

1970 comedy films
German comedy films
West German films
Films directed by Rolf Thiele
Remakes of German films
Films based on Hungarian novels
1970s German-language films
1970s German films